Michael Power / St. Joseph High School (locally referred as Michael Power, MPSJ or Power) is a Catholic secondary school in Toronto, Ontario, Canada. It is located in the Six Points neighbourhood of Etobicoke. The school is an amalgamation of two independent schools in the neighbourhood, Michael Power High School (an all-male school started by the Basilian Fathers in 1957 initially known as St. Francis High School, later Bishop Power High School) and St. Joseph Islington High School (an all-female school led by the Sisters of St. Joseph in 1949) with the two schools amalgamated in 1982 officially. The school joined the Metropolitan Separate School Board in 1987.

In 1993, Michael Power / St. Joseph moved west and north to the former site of Vincent Massey Collegiate Institute, built in 1961 by the Etobicoke Board of Education (later amalgamated with the Toronto District School Board) and closed in 1985, on Eringate Drive, in which the campus has been leased to the MSSB/TCDSB since 1990.

It is the largest high school in the Toronto Catholic District School Board and one of the largest secondary school population in Toronto with 1941 students in the 2017–18 year and the second largest in Toronto. MPSJ is ranked 244 out of 739 in the 2018-2019 Fraser Institute report card with a 6.9 rating. MPSJ offers the International Baccalaureate (IB) program since 2002 and one of the few TCDSB schools to operate it.

The mottos for the school are in the Basilian tradition of "Doce Me Bonitatem et Disciplinam et Scientiam" (Teach me goodness, discipline and knowledge) and the Sister of St. Joseph belief of "Congregavit nos in unum Christi amor" (The love of Christ has gathered us together into one).

History

Story of namesakes

The Sisters of St. Joseph as founded in Le Puy by the Jesuit Jean Paul Médaille on October 15, 1650. On the following March 10, the local bishop, Henri de Maupas, granted ecclesiastical approval to these women. On December 13, 1651, the Sisters of St. Joseph presented themselves to the Royal Notary in LePuy for their legal incorporation. The Sisters of St. Joseph at Toronto came into existence in 1851. The sisters taught in many schools across Canada since their establishment in the country.

Michael Power was born in Halifax, Nova Scotia, Canada to Captain William Power and Mary Roach. He went to Seminary of St. Sulpice, Montreal and Seminary of Quebec and was ordained a priest in 1827 by Bishop Dubois. He served as missionary priest of the Archdiocese of Québec and the Diocese of Montréal until 1839 when he was appointed Vicar General of Montréal. Power was canonically erected as Bishop of Toronto in 1841 by Pope Gregory XVI. Father Michael Power was appointed the first Bishop of the new See. He was also the first English-speaking Bishop to be born in Canada. His tenure came to an end as he died from typhus in Toronto on October 1, 1847, while ministering to recently arrived Irish immigrants, escaping the Great Irish Famine.

The school history
The present school began as two distinct high schools in the Islington-City Centre West neighbourhood (better known as Six Points) of Kipling, Dundas and Bloor. Auxiliary Bishop Francis V. Allen of Our Lady of Sorrows Parish was instrumental on setting up two high schools in the Archdiocese of Toronto for Etobicoke's Roman Catholic community.

The Sisters of St. Joseph opened St. Joseph's Islington, an all-girls high school named after the patron of Canada himself, Saint Joseph, located on 3700 Bloor Street West near Islington Avenue on September 12, 1949, with a population of 150 girls. The first principal of that school was Sister Mary Rita C.S.J.

Eight years later, starting in 1957, the Basilian Fathers started Michael Power High School, an all-boys high school on 5055 Dundas Street West behind a farmhouse, in an orchard and next to an Esso station, named after the first Catholic bishop of Toronto. Initially, the Basilians wanted to name the school after one of their patrons, St. Francis. This led to James Charles McGuigan's advice to the Basilians to settle the name of Bishop Power High School for the deeds and documents, which the name was later displayed on the "1957" cornerstone. Eventually, the Archdiocese established the school name of Michael Power High School as its official name. Construction of the school began in 1956 and the building was completed within the span of nine months until it opened on September 3 of the following year.

Under the school's founding principal Reverend John Mullins C.S.B., six Basilian Fathers were appointed to run the school the first year, with 160 students enrolled and tuition was $150. McGuigan officially opened and blessed the school on September 15, 1957.

The orchard was cut down the summer before the school opened to begin work on a playing field that would take over two years to complete. An additional wing was added to Michael Power in 1960. By 1961, Power students were taking biology classes at St. Joseph's and St. Joseph's students were at Power to take physics, Latin and a few other subjects. The first graduates emerged that same year. By 1963, Michael Power was debt-free.

Beginning in 1967, while Michael Power's 10th anniversary coincided with the country's 100th birthday, the schools entered an agreement with the Metropolitan Separate School Board (now the Toronto Catholic District School Board), whereby Grade 9 and 10 students would be under the publicly funded separate school system, while grades 11-13 continued to be taught by the Basilian Fathers and the Sisters of St. Joseph.

Into the 1970s, the new classrooms and a gym arrived with the centre portable, south portable and gym C in 1971. Michael Power became a co-educational school (with the girls being admitted into the institution) in 1973, it saw the introduction of the semester system being from nine 1/2 hour classes to four 70 minute classes despite the girls continued to attend St. Joseph's Islington. In terms of athletics, Power dominate nearly every team and individual sport in the TDCAA (and also Ontario) as far as track and field was concerned. The Junior Trojans football team won all ten league and exhibition games on their way to the championship as well as never being scored against in 1975. With a shining success of the union of Michael Power and St. Joseph's High School was the day Father Malone, the principal showed up wearing a blazer made of St. Joseph's Islington kilt plaid in a foreshadowing move. The graduating class of 1978 from Michael Power and St. Joseph's held the graduation ceremony at St. Michael's Cathedral. It was moved to the Etobicoke Olympium (now the ceremonies are held since then at Mississauga Convention Centre).

By then, rumours began to circulate that the Michael Power/St. Joseph's properties were to be sold to a developer and the schools consolidated to Royal York Collegiate Institute (later Etobicoke School of the Arts).

The two schools were officially unified under one name - Michael Power • St. Joseph in September 1982 on the same Bloor-Dundas complex. The designated principal was a Basilian Father while the vice-principal was a Sister of St. Joseph.  By 1984, however, the Ontario Government began funding Catholic high schools beyond Grade 10. As the Basilian Fathers continued to lead Michael Power/St. Joseph until the retirement of Fr. Paul James and the withdrawal of the Basilian Fathers and the Sisters of St. Joseph in 1987, Michael Power-St. Joseph was ceased as a private school, although it maintained the tradition characterized the coexistence of these two separate school communities throughout the 1960s and 1970s. The operations, curriculum, funding, and maintenance of Michael Power • St. Joseph was passed on to the MSSB.

As a result of overcrowding at the main campus during the 1980s, the south campus of Michael Power/St. Joseph with 17 staff and 300 students under vice-principal Jack Smith was established on the former Alderwood Collegiate Institute in spring 1985 with the Basilian tradition: "Teach me goodness, discipline, and knowledge". The campus itself became a standalone high school and was named after Father John Redmond, a former principal and teacher at Michael Power/St. Joseph as well as a Basilian priest, educator and prominent national track and field coach: Father John Redmond Catholic Secondary School was established on September 2, 1986.

In September 1993, the school moved to its present location on 105 Eringate Drive, the former home of Vincent Massey Collegiate Institute, which was closed in 1985 by the Etobicoke Board of Education due to low enrollment and the property was transferred to the MSSB by July 1, 1990. However, that site was served as an adult learning centre and the campus for Mississauga's Philip Pocock Catholic Secondary School for grades 11-13 from 1987 to 1992. Eventually, the area served by MPSJ was filled the void by the opening of Bishop Allen Academy in 1989, in which the school was named after the former pastor of Our Lady of Sorrows.

At one point, the old buildings on Dundas and Bloor served as the new campus for Monsignor Fraser College from 1994 until it moved to Thistletown Blvd (later Plunkett Blvd. and now on Norfinch Drive) when the schools were demolished in the late 1990s and was sold to the condo developer, Pemberton Group to make way for the condos that were built on the old campuses in 2003 and a park built as well.

Overview

Michael Power • St. Joseph focuses on academics, athletics, arts, leadership, extracurricular activities, technology and community service. The features of former Massey site built in 12 acres of land include, 3 gymnasiums that can be partitioned into smaller gyms, a weight room, a large forum, newly renovated auditorium, 45+ classrooms, a sports field, a 400m track, a courtyard, music rooms, art rooms, computer labs, and a library. There are six portable facilities housed Michael Power/St. Joseph Massey campus.

Operating on the semestered system, the current enrolment of the school as of the 2017–18 school year is 1941 students and the staff, which is the largest high school by population in the Toronto Catholic District School Board and the second largest in Toronto. The teachers have established a strong tradition of strong academic standards. Currently, almost 90% of MPSJ graduates gain admission to university and college. It also has a diverse ethnic student population consisting of Polish, Ukrainian, Italian, Irish, German, South Asian, Chinese and many others.

Started in 2004, Powerful Visions is Michael Power•St. Joseph's annual creative art and media exhibition. Featured student work has gone on to win awards at the national Mind, Media and the Message Festival and displayed in their exhibition at the Ontario Science Centre.

Michael Power-St Joseph also has a student leadership system. The overall focus of the leadership program is to create students which model the Catholic Graduate Expectations. In 2007, Power P.L.A.Y. Leaders presented at the largest leadership conference in Ontario. To this day they remain the only High School ever asked to do so. These young leaders are further developed through the Leadership Course, which offers hands on experience running various charitable initiatives.

The school was certified to offer the International Baccalaureate Diploma programme in June 2002.
The current IB coordinators are Gregory Scully and Luana Fanelli.

School media
Michael Power/St. Joseph High School uses many media forums to communicate with the school community. Publications such as The Post (student newspaper), Clarion (yearbook), and PowerLines (quarterly newsletter) are distributed to students throughout the academic school year. MPSJ also uses digital methods of communication such as its closed circuit television information system dubbed PowerTV and website mpsj.ca. The majority of these services are student run and monitored by faculty members.

Clarion (Yearbook)
The Michael Power/St. Joseph yearbook, Clarion, is an entirely student run and organized initiative. It started as two independent books back in the 1950s and 1960s; Clarion was the yearbook of St. Joseph High School and Michael Power High School had its own respective version. The Michael Power yearbook for 1971 was called "The Mitre" and the Editor's Note says it was the third edition.   When the two schools officially amalgamated in 1982, both yearbook committees joined and adapted Clarion as the official name to be used for all future publications. Archives of past yearbooks can be found in the MPSJ Library and in the Yearbook Office.

The yearbook has grown over the years and remains focused on preserving all aspects of school and student life. More recent editions of Clarion total 250+ pages and have won several awards from the Toronto Sun Newspaper Yearbook Awards.

The Post (student newspaper)
Founded in 1963, The Post is Michael Power/St. Joseph's student newspaper. The paper is an entirely student run initiative and is overseen by a teacher moderator. The Post is one of the larger clubs at MPSJ and allows all students to submit work for publication. It covers everything from Editorials, Student Life, Opinion, Arts and Entertainment, Sports, Music, News, Poetry and as of 2005 a French section.

The paper has undergone many changes in recent years such as the conversion to a completely digitally laid out paper and in 2005 an online version became available. The Post has also been the recipient of several awards from the Toronto Star High School Newspaper Awards.

From 2004 until 2006 editorial staff at The Post planned to introduce a student magazine entitled Empowerment. While plans were made to use the magazine to complement The Post newspaper, it unfortunately never took off due to time restrictions. The intention was to produce two issues of Empowerment while continuing to publish four issues of The Post every academic year.

PowerTV
In the spring of 2006 Michael Power/St. Joseph launched PowerTV – a closed circuit television information system. The system was designed to use strategically placed plasma televisions throughout the school to display announcements and event highlights. It runs all day long with text-based announcements, video highlights of sports games, school events and student animations.

The system provides a forum for student created artwork and events to be showcased to the school community. It is overseen by school administrators but content is created and updated by students in media and communication technology classes. The PowerTV system is seen as an innovative addition to media and technology based learning curriculum. It provides real-time practical experience of advanced digital broadcasting while providing an incentive for students to be fully engaged in media production and creative design.

The school also runs a YouTube channel launched in 2013 under the name Michael PowerTV, showcasing the school videos in addition to their CCTV system.

Notable alumni
 Drake Berehowsky, NHL hockey player, former Toronto Maple Leaf
 Connor Brown, NHL hockey player, current Ottawa Senator
 Bonnie Crombie, MP for Mississauga—Streetsville (2008-2011), City Councillor Ward 5 (Mississauga) 2011–2014, Mayor of Mississauga (2014–Present)
 Cynthia Dale, actress
 Jennifer Dale, actress
 Jason Gavadza, CFL/NFL football player
Guy Giorno, Chief of Staff to Prime Minister Stephen Harper and Ontario Premier Mike Harris
 Glenn Goldup, NHL hockey player 
 Mike Kennedy, NHL/DEL hockey player, former Toronto Maple Leaf
 Chris Kolankowski, Toronto Argonauts Offensive Lineman
James Maloney, MP Etobicoke-Lakeshore
 Mark Nohra, CFL/NFL football player
 Gerry O'Flaherty, NHL hockey player, former Toronto Maple Leaf
 Mike Pelyk, NHL/WHA hockey player, former Toronto Maple Leaf
Evan Rodrigues, NHL hockey player, Toronto Maple Leafs
 Brendan Shanahan, former NHL hockey player, former league official, current President Toronto Maple Leaf Hockey Club

See also
List of high schools in Ontario
Vincent Massey Collegiate Institute

References

External links
 Michael Power • St. Joseph High School
TCDSB Portal
International Baccalaureate Organization
Michael Power/St. Joseph on YouTube

Toronto Catholic District School Board
High schools in Toronto
Education in Etobicoke
International Baccalaureate schools in Ontario
Educational institutions established in 1982
Catholic secondary schools in Ontario
Modernist architecture in Canada
Bill 30 schools
1982 establishments in Ontario
Basilian schools